Shadow Dancer may refer to:

 Shadow Dancer (1989 video game), side-scrolling action game produced by Sega originally released as an arcade game in 1989
 Shadow Dancer: The Secret of Shinobi, side-scrolling action game produced by Sega originally released for the Mega Drive/Genesis in 1990
 Shadow Dancer (band), British techno band
 Shadow Dancer (film), 2012 British-Irish drama film directed by James Marsh